The 2011–12 Furman Paladins men's basketball team represents Furman University during the 2011–12 NCAA Division I men's basketball season. The Paladins, led by 6th year head coach Jeff Jackson, play their home games at Timmons Arena and are members of the Southern Conference's South Division.

Previous season
The Paladins finished the 2010–11 season 22–11, 12–6 in SoCon play and lost in the first round of the CIT tournament to East Tennessee State.

Roster

Schedule

|-
!colspan=9| Regular Season

|-
!colspan=9| SoCon tournament

References

Furman
Furman Paladins men's basketball seasons
Furm
Furm